Lancia E290 is an Italian electric truck produced from 1941 to 1947 from Lancia.

History
The truck is used during 2nd World War.

Technical characteristic
The emissions are 0 g/km.
The weight of the Lancia E290 is around 5 t.

Production
From the electric version 61 examples were produced.
In total 202 electric trucks were built (E290 + E291).
After the war, some were modified to run with petrol engines.

References 
Camion Lancia, Massimo Condolo

E290